Andrea Molino (born 1964 in Turin, Italy) is an Italian composer and conductor. He has first attracted international attention through a video/music theatre work, Those Who Speak In A Faint Voice, a project about  capital punishment, and later through the multimedia music theatre projects Credo, and Winners.

He has been musical director of the Pocket Opera Company Nuremberg (1996–2007). As artistic director of the Music Department of Fabrica (2000–2006), he has worked on projects together with Heiner Goebbels, David Moss, Koichi Makigami and others. For the 2007–2008 season he was invited artist at Le Fresnoy, Lille (France). 2009 he was artistic director of the World Venice Forum, where he conducted his own multimedia concert Of Flowers And Flames, for the 25th anniversary of the Bhopal disaster, in India. Three Mile Island, on the nuclear accident in Pennsylvania in 1979, was first performed in March 2012 at the ZKM in Karlsruhe; the project received the Music Theatre Now Award 2013. His latest opera, - there is no why here -, was premiered at the Teatro Comunale di Bologna in 2014 and was presented in 2015 in Antwerp at deSingel for the Flemish Opera (Opera XXI Festival). I want the things, written for David Moss, has been shown in 2020 by the Abbey Theatre in Dublin as a part of their Dear Ireland project.

Recent projects as a conductor include Alban Berg's Wozzeck directed by William Kentridge and Shostakovich's The Nose, directed by Barrie Kosky at the Sydney Opera House for Opera Australia; the world premiere of Cathy Marston's The Cellist at the Royal Opera House in London; Szymanowski's Kròl Roger at the Royal Swedish Opera in Stockholm, a Mahler/Messiaen/Strauss program with Thomas Hampson and the Melbourne Symphony Orchestra and Carmen at the Théâtre du Capitole in Toulouse. For Opera Australia he had previously conducted Kròl Roger (directed by Kasper Holten, Green Room Award 2018), Carmen, Tosca and La Bohème (the latter was also the 2015 NYE Gala at the Sydney Opera House), A Masked Ball (directed by Alex Ollé - La Fura dels Baus) and Macbeth among others. He opened the 2010 concert season of the Teatro La Fenice in Venice with the world premiere of Bruno Maderna's Requiem. At the Teatro La Fenice he had opened the 2005 edition of the Venice Music Biennale with Heiner Goebbels’ Surrogate Cities and he conducted the world premiere productions of Mosca's Signor Goldoni (2007) and Ambrosini's Il Killer di Parole (2010). 
His work is documented on many CDs and on DVDs.

Biography
Andrea Molino studied in Turin, Milan, Venice, Paris and Freiburg. He lives in Zurich. In 1997, as musical director of the Pocket Opera Company in Nuremberg he conducted the world premiere of Alessandro Melchiorre's Unreported inbound Palermo and in 2000, the premiere of the stage version of Heiner Goebbels' Surrogate Cities. His own projects the smiling carcass (1999), based on the subject of advertising, and Those Who Speak In A Faint Voice (2001), on death penalty, both in collaboration with the Italian photographer Oliviero Toscani, are the first examples of his commitment towards innovative, multimedia oriented music theatre.

From 2000 to 2006 Andrea Molino was artistic director of Fabrica Musica, the music department of the Italian communication research center, Fabrica. As well as collaborating with musicians like Heiner Goebbels, David Moss, Koichi Makigami, and Phil Minton, his own projects have included VOICES, performed in October 2000 at the RomaEuropa Festival featuring previously unseen video material by Godfrey Reggio, and Drops On A Hot Stone, in collaboration with UN Volunteers, premiered in December 2001 at the Capitol in Rome after a preview in Berlin. CREDO, a multimedia music theatre on the theme of ethnic and religious conflicts was premiered in April 2004 at the Staatstheater Karlsruhe and then performed at the Stazione Termini in Rome with the Orchestra del Maggio Musicale Fiorentino, on the occasion of the World Summit of Nobel Peace Laureates; in July 2005 it opened the Queensland Music Festival in Brisbane, Australia. His most recent multimedia music project with Fabrica, WINNERS, has been premiered, conducted by himself, on 22 July 2006 at the Brisbane Festival; the European premiere took place in October 2006 in Paris at the Grande Salle of the Centre Pompidou.

The multimedia staged concert "un Temps vécu, ou qui pourrait l’être" had its world premiere on 6 June 2008 at Le Fresnoy – Studio National des Arts Contemporains, in Lille, where Molino was “Invited Artist” for the season 2007–2008.

2008 to 2010 Andrea Molino was Music Curator at the Fondazione Claudio Buziol in Venice. In October 2009, as artistic director of the World Venice Forum, he curated the Festival The Garden Of Forking Paths. In the closing concert at the Basilica dei Frari he conducted the Orchestra del Teatro La Fenice in his own multimedia concert Of Flowers And Flames, for the 25th anniversary of the Bhopal disaster, in India. His latest project, Three Mile Island, on the nuclear accident in Pennsylvania in 1979, was first performed in March 2012 at the ZKM in Karlsruhe with the Neue Vocalsolisten Stuttgart and the Klangforum Wien; the Italian Premiere followed at the Teatro India in Rome. The project received the Music Theatre Now Award 2012.

His latest opera, - there is no why here -, was premiered at the Teatro Comunale di Bologna in April 2014 and will be presented next May in Antwerp at deSingel for the Flemish Opera (Opera XXI Festival).

I want the things, written for David Moss, has been shown in 2020 by the Abbey Theatre in Dublin as a part of their Dear Ireland project.

Recent projects as a conductor include Alban Berg's Wozzeck directed by William Kentridge and Shostakovich's The Nose, directed by Barrie Kosky at the Sydney Opera House for Opera Australia; the world premiere of Cathy Marston's The Cellist at the Royal Opera House in London; Szymanowski's Kròl Roger at the Royal Swedish Opera in Stockholm, a Mahler/Messiaen/Strauss program at the Hamer Hall in Melbourne with Thomas Hampson and the Melbourne Symphony Orchestra; Carmen at the Théâtre du Capitole in Toulouse.

For Opera Australia he had previously conducted Kròl Roger (directed by Kasper Holten, Green Room Award 2018), Carmen, Tosca and La Bohème (the latter was also the 2015 NYE Gala at the Sydney Opera House), A Masked Ball (directed by Alex Ollé - La Fura dels Baus) and Macbeth and Rossini's The Barber of Seville among others. He opened the 2010 concert season of the Teatro La Fenice in Venice with the world premiere of Bruno Maderna's Requiem. At the Teatro La Fenice he had opened the 2005 edition of the Venice Music Biennale with Heiner Goebbels’ Surrogate Cities and he conducted the world premiere productions of Mosca's Signor Goldoni (2007) and Ambrosini's Il Killer di Parole (2010).

He conducted the Orchestra del Maggio Musicale Fiorentino, the Brussels Philharmonic, the Bochumer Symphoniker, the Badische Staatskapelle Karlsruhe, the Dresdner Sinfoniker, the BBC Scottish Symphony Orchestra, the Royal Swedish Orchestra, The Orchestre national du Capitole de Toulouse, the Orchestre National de Lyon, the Orchestre Symphonique et Lyrique de Nancy, the Melbourne Symphony Orchestra, the Queensland Symphony Orchestra at the Edinburgh Festival, Wiener Konzerthaus, Sydney Festival, Berliner Festspiele / März Musik in the Berliner Philharmonie, Queensland Music Festival, Brisbane Festival, Teatro Comunale in Bologna, Teatro dell'Opera in Rome, Opéra national de Nancy, Staatstheater Darmstadt, RomaEuropa Festival, Schauspielhaus Zurich (with the world premiere of Goebbels' Industry and Idleness, 2010), Musik der Jahrhunderte Stuttgart, Zagreb Biennale, Hellerau Dresden.

His compositions are published by RAI Trade (Rome), Nuova Stradivarius (Milan) and Ricordi (Milan).
He has been recording with Naive (Paris), ECM (Munich), Stradivarius (Milan) and ABC Classics (Sydney) among others.

Selected works
 I want the things (2020), music video for solo voice with percussion (for David Moss)
 The Sense of the Place - Dublin (2019), music video series for solo bass clarinet in multiple locations
 - there is no why here - (2014), multimedia music theatre for vocal and instrumental soloists, performers, large orchestra, live electronics and live video
 Three Mile Island (2012), multimedia staged concert for vocal ensemble, instrumental ensemble, live electronics and live video.
 Open, Air (2012), for voices, instruments and orchestra in open space.
 Of Flowers And Flames (2009), multimedia concert for solo Sarangi (video), symphony orchestra and live video for the 25th anniversary of the Bhopal disaster, in India.
 un Temps vécu, ou qui pourrait l'être (2007–2008), multimedia staged concert for vocalist, basset horn, percussion, actress, live electronics and live video
 WINNERS (2005–06), multimedia music action for 2 saxophones, 7 solo percussionists, symphony orchestra, live electronics and live video
 CREDO (2003–04), multimedia music theatre for vocal and instrumental soloists, actors, large orchestra, live electronics, live video and live satellite connections
 Drops On A Hot Stone (2001) for instrumental ensemble, live electronics and live video
 Those Who Speak In A Faint Voice (2000–2001) for solo vocalist, solo saxophone, instrumental ensemble, live electronics and live video
 Voices (2000) for solo vocalist, instrumental ensemble, live electronics and live video
 The Smiling Carcass (1998–99) solo vocalist, 2 actors, madrigal ensemble, solo saxophone, ensemble and live electronics
 Earth and Heart Dances (1997) for 5 percussionists and live electronics
 Gesti per un tempo di passione (1996) for 14 instruments

Selected CDs and DVDs
 Various Composers: Agony and Ecstasy (Emma Matthews, Soprano; Melbourne Symphony Orchestra, conductor: Andrea Molino; ABC Classics, 2016)
 Various Composers: The Kiss (Nicole Car, Soprano; Opera Australia Orchestra, conductor: Andrea Molino; ABC Classics, 2015)
 Marc Sinan: Hasretim (DVD of the world premiere, Dresdner Sinfoniker, conductor: Andrea Molino; ECM, Munich, 2013)
 Andrea Molino: CREDO (DVD of the world premiere, conductor: Andrea Molino; Naive, Paris, 2006)
 Luca Mosca: Signor Goldoni (DVD of the world premiere at the Teatro La Fenice in Venice; DVD Dynamic 33600, 2008)
 Andrea Molino: The Smiling Carcass ( live recording of the production of the Pocket Opera Company in collaboration with Bayerischer Rundfunk, conductor: Andrea Molino; CD Stradivarius STR 33558, 1999)
 Bruno Maderna: Serenata n.2, Concerto per 2 pianoforti (A. Orvieto, M. Rapetti, Pf.; Ex Novo Ensemble, Venice; Demoé Percussion Ensemble, Aosta, conductor: Andrea Molino; CD Stradivarius STR 33536, 1999)
 Andrea Molino: Earth and Heart Dances (Demoé Percussion Ensemble, Aosta; CD Stradivarius STR 33499, 1998)

Awards and nominations

ARIA Awards
The ARIA Music Awards are presented annually from 1987 by the Australian Recording Industry Association (ARIA). 

! 
|-
| 2016
| This Kiss (with Nicole Car, Opera Australia & Australian Ballet Orchestra)
| Best Classical Album
| 
| 
|-

References

External links
 Official website

Italian composers
Italian male composers
Italian male conductors (music)
Living people
1964 births
Musicians from Turin
21st-century Italian conductors (music)
21st-century Italian male musicians